Joseph V. Anglin is an American-born Canadian politician who lives in Rimbey, Alberta, Canada. He was the leader of the Alberta Greens from 2008 until its dissolution in 2009. Since April 23, 2012, he sat as a Member of the Legislative Assembly of Alberta for Rimbey-Rocky Mountain House-Sundre. He was a member of the Wildrose Party until he left its caucus on November 2, 2014. He sat as an independent until his defeat in the 2015 Alberta general election.

Early life
Anglin was born in Massachusetts. He served in the United States Marine Corps and worked as a police officer in the 1970s. He moved to Canada and obtained Canadian citizenship in 1995. He served in the Canadian Coast Guard for six years. Anglin founded and acted as CEO of ASIG Inc., which operated as an international financial services firm, which specialized in trading derivatives, oil contracts, gas contracts and currencies. Anglin worked as a lineman for a public electric utility before going on to work for AT&T. He obtained a diploma in engineering and worked his way up into executive management. During his time with AT&T he taught fibre-optic transmission engineering at the Bell Labs training facilities in Chicago and served as the White House communications liaison for George H. W. Bush in Kennebunkport, Maine.

Political career

Advocacy and local politics
Anglin organized and led the Lavesta Area Group, an association of southern Alberta landowners opposed to the construction of a 500 kV electricity transmission line through their area, from 2006 to 2010. He served as chair of the Rimoka Housing Foundation from 2010 to 2012 and also served as a town councillor in Rimbey from 2010 until his election to the Legislative Assembly of Alberta.

Anglin toured dozens of Albertan communities between 2009 and 2012, speaking out against the Electric Statutes Amendment Act (Bill 50), which granted cabinet power to approve major power lines as critical infrastructure without a public hearing and needs assessment by the Alberta Utilities Commission. In response to public criticism of the Act, the government revoked Cabinet's ability to approve critical transmission projects without a needs assessment in the fall of 2012, but the amendment did not affect the four transmission projects that were approved by cabinet under Bill 50 prior to the amendment.

Anglin gained wide public attention in Alberta after he exposed the Energy and Utilities Board for spying on people who opposed power lines being put through their land.

Leader of the Alberta Greens
Anglin ran for the Alberta Green Party in the Lacombe-Ponoka electoral district in the 2008 Alberta general election. He finished second to incumbent Ray Prins.

Anglin became interim leader of the Green Party in the fall of 2008. The validity of the meeting at which Anglin was elected was challenged by the party's previous leadership. Anglin presided over the dissolution of the party in July 2009. He attributed the party's failure to file required financial returns with Elections Alberta to a refusal by the previous executive to hand over necessary documentation. David Crowe, the previous CFO for the party, has denied Anglin's allegation, and has provided documentation of what he made available to the party and when, indicating that all needed documentation was made available in a timely manner.

Member of the Legislative Assembly
In 2012, Anglin became a candidate for the Wildrose Party for the riding of Rimbey-Rocky Mountain House-Sundre, which he won in the 2012 general election. Anglin left the Wildrose Party on November 2, 2014, to sit as an independent. In January 2015, he announced that he would seek the Progressive Conservative nomination in his riding. Anglin's candidacy was rejected by the Progressive Conservatives, with the party indicating that allowing his candidacy would not have been in the 'best interests of the party' Anglin opted to run as an independent in his riding, where he finished fourth.

In 2018, Anglin announced his intention to run under the Freedom Conservative banner in the upcoming election. but then ran for the Alberta Party.

Later joined the Alberta Party.

Electoral results

2019 general election

2015 general election

2012 general election

2008 general election

References

Alberta Greens candidates in Alberta provincial elections
Living people
Alberta political party leaders
Leaders of the Alberta Greens
Wildrose Party MLAs
Independent Alberta MLAs
21st-century Canadian politicians
Year of birth missing (living people)
Alberta Party candidates in Alberta provincial elections